This is of the governors of the Province of Georgia from 1732 until 1782, including the restored Loyalist administration during the War of American Independence.

References

Governors
Lists of American colonial governors
Colonial governors of Georgia (U.S. state)
Governors